Church of the True God may refer to:

 Church of the True God, Shaoxing